Track cycling at the 2017 Asian Indoor and Martial Arts Games took place at Ashgabat Velodrome, Ashgabat.

Medalists

Men

Women

Medal table

Results

Men

Sprint

Qualifying
20 September

1/16 finals
20 September

1/16 finals repechage
20 September

1/8 finals
20 September

1/8 finals repechage
20 September

Quarterfinals
21 September

Semifinals
21 September

Finals
22 September

Keirin
23 September

1st round

First round repechage

2nd round

Finals

Omnium
23 September

Team sprint
18 September

Qualifying

1st round

Finals

Team pursuit

Qualifying
19 September

1st round
21 September

Finals
22 September

Women

Sprint

Qualifying
19 September

Quarterfinals
19 September

Semifinals
20 September

Finals
20 September

Keirin
22 September

1st round

Finals

Omnium
23 September

Team sprint
21 September

Qualifying

1st round

Finals

References

External links
Results book – Track Cycling

2017 Asian Indoor and Martial Arts Games events
Asian Indoor and Martial Arts Games
2017